There are only a few terrorist attacks in Pakistan, resulting over 50 deaths.

February – March 
 28 February:- Two policemen were shot dead outside the United States consulate in Karachi, the same place where 12 people were killed by a car bomb nine months ago.
 10 March:- Two people were injured when a masked terrorist opened indiscriminate fire on a mosque in Gulistan Colony, Faisalabad.

June – July 
 8 June:- 11 Pakistani police trainees were shot dead in what is believed to have been a sectarian attack on Sariab Road, Quetta, as they all belonged to Hazara Shi'a branch of Islam. Another nine were reported wounded.
 4 July:- At least 47 people were killed and 150 injured in an attack on a Shia mosque in the south-western Pakistani city of Quetta.

October – December 
 3 October:- Six employees of Space and Upper Atmosphere Research Commission (SUPARCO) were killed and several others injured when their official van was fired upon on Hub River Road in Mauripur, Karachi. A Lashkar-e-Jhangvi cadre was officially charged.
 6 October:- Maulana Azam Tariq, chief of the Millat-i-Islamia (formerly Sipah-e-Sahaba Pakistan) and MNA, was assassinated by unidentified gunmen along with four others as his car drove into the capital, Islamabad.
 14 December:- President Pervez Musharraf survived an assassination attempt when a powerful bomb went off minutes after his highly guarded convoy crossed a bridge in Rawalpindi. Musharraf was apparently saved by a jamming device in his limousine that prevented the remote controlled explosives from blowing up the bridge as his convoy passed over it.
 25 December:- Another attempt was carried on the president 11 days later when two suicide bombers tried to assassinate Musharraf, but their car bombs failed to kill the president; 16 others nearby died instead. Musharraf escaped with only a cracked windscreen on his car. Militant Amjad Farooqi was apparently suspected as being the mastermind behind these attempts, and was killed by Pakistani forces in 2004 after an extensive manhunt.

References 

 
2003 in Pakistan
2003